Schneck (German and Jewish (Ashkenazic): affectionate nickname for a slow person or for a slow or indolent worker from Middle High German snecke German Schneck(e) Yiddish shnek "snail") is a German and Ashkenazi Jewish surname.

Geographical distribution
As of 2014, 46.8% of all known bearers of the surname Schneck were residents of Germany (frequency 1:19,938), 40.2% of the United States (1:104,468), 4.1% of Brazil (1:577,718), 3.2% of Austria (1:31,074), 1.0% of England (1:639,077) and 1.0% of France (1:811,068).

In Germany, the frequency of the surname was higher than national average (1:19,938) in the following states:
 1. Baden-Württemberg (1:6,022)
 2. Bavaria (1:12,255)
 3. Rhineland-Palatinate (1:13,696)

People
Attilio Schneck (born 1946), Italian politician
Dave Schneck (born 1949), American baseball player
Mike Schneck (born 1977), American football player
Phyllis Schneck, American computer scientist
Robert Damon Schneck, American writer
Stephen F. Schneck (born 1953), American Catholic activist

References

German-language surnames
Surnames from nicknames